AT&T Corporation, originally the American Telephone and Telegraph Company, is the subsidiary of AT&T Inc. that provides voice, video, data, and Internet telecommunications and professional services to businesses, consumers, and government agencies.

During the Bell System's long history, AT&T was at times the world's largest telephone company, the world's largest cable television operator, and a regulated monopoly. At its peak in the 1950s and 1960s, it employed one million people and its revenue ranged between US$3 billion in 1950 ($ in present-day terms) and $12 billion in 1966 ($ in present-day terms).

In 2005, AT&T was purchased by Baby Bell and former subsidiary SBC Communications for more than $16 billion ($ in present-day terms). SBC then changed its name to AT&T Inc. Today, AT&T Corporation continues to exist as the long distance subsidiary of AT&T Inc., and its name occasionally shows up in AT&T press releases.

Buildings with AT&T logo 

 AT&T Huron Building, Cleveland
 AT&T Building, Nashville
 AT&T Building, Indianapolis

History

Origins

AT&T started with Bell Patent Association, a legal entity established in 1874 to protect the patent rights of Alexander Graham Bell after he invented the telephone system. Originally a verbal agreement, it was formalized in writing in 1875 as Bell Telephone Company.

In 1880 the management of American Bell had created what would become AT&T Long Lines. The project was the first of its kind to create a nationwide long-distance network with a commercially viable cost-structure. The project was formally incorporated in New York as a separate company named American Telephone and Telegraph Company on March 3, 1885. Originating in New York City, its long-distance telephone network reached Chicago, Illinois, in 1892, with its multitudes of local exchanges continuing to stretch further and further yearly, eventually creating a continent-wide telephone system. On December 30, 1899, the assets of American Bell were transferred into its subsidiary American Telephone and Telegraph Company (formerly AT&T Long Lines); this was because Massachusetts corporate laws were very restrictive, and limited capitalization to ten million dollars, forestalling American Bell's further growth. With this assets transfer at the very end of the 19th century, AT&T became the parent of both American Bell and the Bell System.

AT&T was involved mainly in the telephone business and, although it was a partner with RCA, was reluctant to see radio grow because such growth might diminish the demand for wired services. It established station WEAF in New York as what was termed a toll station. AT&T could provide no programming, but anyone who wished to broadcast a message could pay a "toll" to AT&T and then air the message publicly. The original studio was the size of a telephone booth. The idea, however, did not take hold, because people would pay to broadcast messages only if they were sure that someone was listening. As a result, WEAF began broadcasting entertainment material, drawing amateur talent found among its employees. Opposition to AT&T's expansion into radio and an agreement with the National Broadcasting Company to lease long-distance lines for their broadcasts resulted in the sale of the station and its developing network of affiliates to NBC.

Monopoly
Throughout most of the 20th century, AT&T held a monopoly on phone service in the United States and Canada through a network of companies called the Bell System. At this time, the company was nicknamed Ma Bell.

On April 30, 1907, Theodore Newton Vail became President of AT&T. Vail believed in the superiority of one phone system and AT&T adopted the slogan "One Policy, One System, Universal Service." This would be the company's philosophy for the next 70 years.

Under Vail, AT&T began buying up many of the smaller telephone companies including Western Union telegraph. These actions brought unwanted attention from antitrust regulators. Anxious to avoid action from government antitrust suits, AT&T and the federal government entered into an agreement known as the Kingsbury Commitment. In the Kingsbury Commitment, AT&T and the government reached an agreement that allowed AT&T to continue operating as a monopoly. While AT&T periodically faced scrutiny from regulators, this state of affairs continued until the company's breakup in 1984.

The Break-up

The United States Justice Department opened the case United States v. AT&T in 1974. This was prompted by suspicion that AT&T was using monopoly profits from its Western Electric subsidiary to subsidize the cost of its network, a violation of antitrust law. A settlement to this case was finalized in 1982, leading to the division of the company on January 1, 1984, into seven Regional Bell Operating Companies, commonly known as Baby Bells. These companies were:
 Ameritech, acquired by SBC in 1999, now part of AT&T Inc.
 Bell Atlantic (now Verizon Communications), which acquired GTE in 2000
 BellSouth, acquired by AT&T Inc. in 2006
 NYNEX, acquired by Bell Atlantic in 1996, now part of Verizon Communications
 Pacific Telesis, acquired by SBC in 1997, now part of AT&T Inc.
 Southwestern Bell (later SBC, now AT&T Inc.), which acquired AT&T Corp. in 2005
 US West, acquired by Qwest in 2000, which in turn was acquired by CenturyLink (now Lumen Technologies, Inc.) in 2011

Post-breakup, the former parent company's main business was now AT&T Communications Inc., which focused on long-distance services, and with other non-RBOC activities.

AT&T acquired NCR Corporation in 1991. AT&T announced in 1995 that it would split into three companies: a manufacturing/R&D company, a computer company, and a services company. NCR, Bell Labs and AT&T Technologies were to be spun off by 1997. In preparation for its spin-off, AT&T Technologies was renamed Lucent Technologies. Lucent was completely spun off from AT&T in 1996.

Acquisition by SBC

On January 31, 2005, the "Baby Bell" company SBC Communications announced its plans to acquire "Ma Bell" AT&T Corp. for $16 billion. SBC announced in October 2005 that it would shed the "SBC" brand and take the more recognizable AT&T brand, along with the old AT&T's  "T" NYSE ticker symbol.

Merger approval concluded on November 18, 2005; SBC Communications began rebranding the following Monday, November 21 as "the new AT&T" and began trading under the "T" symbol on December 1. Present-day AT&T Inc. claims AT&T Corp.'s history as its own, but retains SBC's pre-2005 stock price history and corporate structure. As well, all SEC filings before 2005 are under SBC, not AT&T.

The AT&T headquarters buildings
From 1885 to 1910, AT&T was headquartered at 125 Milk Street in Boston. With its expansion it moved to New York City, to a headquarters on 195 Broadway (close to what is now the World Trade Center site). The property originally belonged to Western Union, of which AT&T held a controlling interest until 1913 when AT&T divested its interest as part of the Kingsbury Commitment. Construction of the current building began in 1912. Designed by William Welles Bosworth, who played a significant role in designing Kykuit, the Rockefeller mansion north of Tarrytown, New York, it was a modern steel structure clad top to bottom in a Greek-styled exterior, the three-story-high Ionic columns of Vermont granite forming eight registers over a Doric base. The lobby of the AT&T Building was one of the most unusual ones of the era. Instead of a large double-high space, similar to the nearby Woolworth Building, Bosworth designed what is called a "hypostyle hall", with full-bodied Doric columns modeled on the Parthenon, marking out a grid. Bosworth was seeking to coordinate the classical tradition with the requirements of a modern building. Columns were not merely the decorative elements they had become in the hands of other architects but created all the illusion of being real supports. Bosworth also designed the campus of MIT as well as Theodore N. Vail's mansion in Morristown, New Jersey.

In 1978, AT&T commissioned a new building at 550 Madison Avenue. This new AT&T Building was designed by Philip Johnson and quickly became an icon of the new Postmodern architectural style. The building was completed in 1984, the very year of the divestiture of the Bell System. The building proved to be too large for the post-divestiture corporation and in 1993, AT&T leased the building to Sony, who then subsequently owned the building until it was sold in 2013.

Divisions
AT&T, prior to its merger with SBC Communications, had three core companies:
 AT&T Alascom
 AT&T Communications
 AT&T Laboratories

AT&T Alascom continues to sell service in Alaska. AT&T Communications was renamed AT&T Communications – East, Inc. and sold long-distance telephone service and operated as a CLEC outside of the borders of the Bell Operating Companies that AT&T owns. It has now been absorbed into AT&T Corp. and all but 4 of the original 22 subsidiaries that formed AT&T Communications continue to exist. The AT&T company had become too large and the government, wanting to prevent a monopoly forced AT&T to break up. AT&T Laboratories has been integrated into AT&T Labs, formerly named SBC Laboratories.

Nicknames and branding

AT&T was also known as "Ma Bell" and affectionately called "Mother" by phone phreaks. During some strikes by its employees, picketers would wear T-shirts reading, "Ma Bell is a real mother." It is worth noting too that, before the break-up, there was greater consumer recognition of the "Bell System" name, in comparison to the name AT&T. This prompted the company to launch an advertising campaign after the break-up to increase its name recognition. Spinoffs like the Regional Bell Operating Companies or RBOCs were often called "Baby Bells". Ironically, "Ma Bell" was acquired by one of its "Baby Bells", SBC Communications, in 2005.

The AT&T Globe Symbol, the corporate logo designed by Saul Bass in 1983 and originally used by AT&T Information Systems, was created because part of the United States v. AT&T settlement required AT&T to relinquish all claims to the use of Bell System trademarks. It has been nicknamed the "Death Star" in reference to the Death Star space station in Star Wars which the logo resembles. In 1999 it was changed from the 12-line design to the 8-line design. Again in 2005 it was changed to the 3D transparent "marble" design created by Interbrand for use by the parent company AT&T Inc. This name was also given to the iconic Bell Labs facility in Holmdel, New Jersey, now a multi-tenant office facility.

List of AT&T chief executive officers
The following is a list of the 16 CEOs of AT&T Corporation, from its incorporation in 1885 until its purchase by SBC Communications in 2005.

See also

 Bell Telephone Memorial, a monument sculpted by W.S. Allard, commemorating the invention of the telephone
 International Bell Telephone Company, sister company to American Bell Telephone, with its headquarters in Brussels, Belgium

References

Citations

Sources 
 Works cited

External links
 AT&T (Archive)
 The short film A CONTINENT IS BRIDGED (Reel 1 of 4, Reel 2 of 4, Reel 3 of 4, Reel 4 of 4) (1940) is available for free download at the Internet Archive
 American Telephone & Telegraph logos, adverts and historical telephone maps on the Baring archive Risks and Rewards website
 Historical AT&T Financial Documents

AT&T
Bell System
Telecommunications companies established in 1885
Telecommunications monopolies
Companies based in Somerset County, New Jersey